The Spanish missions in the Carolinas were part of a series of religious outposts established by Spanish Catholics in order to spread the Christian doctrine among the local Native Americans. Spanish missions extended north almost to the site of present-day Charleston, and they remained until the arrival of the English (1670).

Missions
 Mission Santa Elena (1566–1587), on Parris Island

See also
 Sebastián Montero

References

Spanish missions in the United States
Pre-statehood history of North Carolina
Pre-statehood history of South Carolina
New Spain
Colonial Mexico
Colonial United States (Spanish)
History of Catholicism in the United States